John Roush (born January 7, 1953) is a former American football player.  He attended the University of Oklahoma and played at the offensive guard position for the Oklahoma Sooners football team. He was a member of the 1974 team coached by Barry Switzer that compiled an 11–0 record and won the national championship. He was also a consensus first-team selection to the 1974 College Football All-America Team. He was also an Academic All-America selection in 1974.

References

Place of birth missing (living people)
1953 births
Living people
All-American college football players
American football offensive guards
Oklahoma Sooners football players
Players of American football from Oklahoma